Tatupu is a Samoan surname that may refer to the following notable people:
Josh Tatupu (born 1986), New Zealand-born Samoan rugby league and rugby union footballer
Lofa Tatupu (born 1982), American football linebacker, son of Mosi 
Mosi Tatupu (1955–2010), National Football League special teamer and running back from American Samoa 
Shem Tatupu (born 1968),  New Zealand rugby league and rugby union footballer
Tony Tatupu (born 1969), New Zealand and Western Samoa rugby league footballer